Wintec Industries, founded in 1988, is headquartered in Newark, California. Wintec provides original equipment manufacturer (OEM), specialized services in product design, manufacturing, and supply chain services related to memory and storage components, featuring: flash modules (CF, SD, USB, CFast, embedded flash, SSD, etc.), DRAM modules (RDIMM, SODIMM, UDIMM, FBDIMM), wireless products, modem products (embedded and USB), and digital display products (ADD2 DVI, HDMI, and digital signage).

On May 31, 2011, Wintec announced a "strategic alliance" with software developer NTI Corporation.

References

Manufacturing companies based in California
Science and technology in the San Francisco Bay Area
Computer companies of the United States